KMD (formerly Kommunedata which literally translates to 'municipality data'),  develops IT solutions for Danish municipalities, government and others, as well as some branches of the army. Until 2009 it was owned by the municipalities' national association (Kommunernes Landsforening - KL), who sold the company to EQT Partners (85%) and Arbejdsmarkedets Tillægspension (15%). In 2012 EQT Partners sold its stake in the company to the private equity company Advent International.

Kommunedata was established in 1972 by a merger of municipal IT centres.

KMD currently employs over 3000 employees.

In 2019, Japanese company NEC acquired KMD for 8 billion DKK.

Subsidiaries
 KMD BPO
 KMD Medialogic
 KMD Poland
 KMD Sverige AB
 KMD International
 Axapoint Aps.

References

External links 
 KMDs official website

Software companies of Denmark
Software companies based in Copenhagen
Companies based in Ballerup Municipality
Danish companies established in 1972
1972 establishments in Denmark
NEC Corporation